Fereydoun Mahdavi was an Iranian economist and politician. From 1974 to 1978, he served in the cabinet under Amir-Abbas Hoveyda.

During the 1960s, Mahdavi was a member of the opposition National Front (II), having been arrested during student protests and jailed as an anti-Shah political prisoner for less than a year. In 1975, he joined the royalist Resurgence Party as a high-ranking member, which severely damaged his reputation.

References 

 
 

1932 births
2014 deaths
National Front (Iran) student activists
Rastakhiz Party politicians
University of Hamburg alumni
Iranian economists
Iranian expatriates in France
Iranian expatriates in Germany
People from Tehran
Iranian bankers
Government ministers of Iran
20th-century Iranian people
21st-century Iranian people